Teucrium cossonii, the fruity germander, is a perennial herb in the family Lamiaceae, endemic to the Balearic Islands.

References
 The Plant List entry

cossonii